Cyril Barnet Salmon, Baron Salmon PC (28 December 1903 – 7 November 1991) was a British judge.

Early life and career
Cyril Barnet Salmon was the son of Montagu Salmon (1878-1943), tobacco merchant, and  Marian Nina Trevor, née Abrahams, his wife. He was the grandson of Barnett Salmon (1829-1897) co-founder of Salmon & Gluckstein, tobacco merchants. He was educated at Mill Hill School and Pembroke College, Cambridge, where he read Law.

He was called to the bar by the Middle Temple in 1925, and was the pupil of Walter Monckton, before joining the chambers of Lord Wright at 5 Crown Office. During World War II, Salmon was commissioned into the Royal Artillery in 1940, and was attached to the Eighth Army as a judge advocate. He ended the war with the rank of major.

Salmon took silk in April 1945. His chambers had been destroyed by bombing during the war, and little of his pre-war practice remained. Nevertheless, Salmon successfully rebuilt his practice. He served as Recorder of Gravesend between 1947 and 1957, and was appointed a Commissioner of Assize for the Wales and Chester Circuit in 1955.

Judicial career
Salmon was appointed to the High Court in 1957 and assigned to the Queen's Bench Division, and received the customary knighthood. In 1964, he was made a Lord Justice of Appeal and sworn of the Privy Council. On 10 January 1972, he was appointed a Lord of Appeal in Ordinary, being created, at the same time, a life peer with the title Baron Salmon, of Sandwich in the County of Kent.

Personal life
On 25 July 1929, Salmon married Rencie Vanderfelt (d. 1942), the daughter of Sydney Gorton Vanderfelt, and they had two children, Gai Rencie Salmon (b. 1933) and David Neville Cyril Salmon (b. 1935).

Following his first wife's death in 1942, Salmon remarried in 1946 to Jean Beatrice Morris, Lady Morris (1912–1989), the elder daughter of Lieutenant-Colonel David Edward Maitland-Makgill-Crichton, and the divorced wife of Michael William Morris, 2nd Baron Morris.

Arms

References

1903 births
1991 deaths
British Jews
Gluckstein family
Law lords 
Members of the Privy Council of the United Kingdom
Members of the Judicial Committee of the Privy Council
Cyril
Knights Bachelor
Alumni of Pembroke College, Cambridge
Royal Artillery officers
Queen's Bench Division judges
Members of the Middle Temple
English King's Counsel
20th-century King's Counsel
People educated at Mill Hill School
20th-century English lawyers